Fakhruddin Ahmed was a Bangladesh diplomat and former Foreign Secretary of Bangladesh.

Early life 
Ahmed was born in 1931. He had a M. A. from the University of Dhaka. He had also studied at The Fletcher School at Tufts University.

Career 
Ahmed joined the Pakistan Foreign Service in 1954.

Ahmed was the Director (Personnel) in the Ministry of Foreign Affairs of Pakistan.

Ahmed returned to Bangladesh in 1973 through Afghanistan after Bangladesh achieved Independence from Pakistan in 1971 and started working in the Ministry of Foreign Affairs in Bangladesh.

From October 1973 to November 1975, Ahmed served as the Foreign Secretary of Bangladesh. After the Assassination of President Sheikh Mujibur Rahman, Ahmed faced difficulties with the new president, Khandokar Moshtaque Ahmed, and was thus made the Ambassador of Bangladesh to Italy.

From 1978 to 1980, Ahmed was the Ambassador of Bangladesh to Albania, Yugoslavia, and Greece.

Ahmed was the High Commissioner of Bangladesh to the United Kingdom in 1982.

From 1986 to 1987, Ahmed served his second term as the Foreign Secretary of Bangladesh.

From 1990 to 1991, Ahmed served as the Foreign Affairs advisor to the President of Bangladesh, Justice Shahabuddin Ahmed, with the rank of a minister. He wrote Critical Times – Memoirs of a South Asian Diplomat about his time in the foreign service.

Death 
Ahmed was staying with his daughter in Pittsburg, United States for cancer treatment in 2001. He died on 2 November 2001 after suffering from cancer for two years.

References 

1931 births
2001 deaths
Bangladeshi diplomats
Foreign Secretaries of Bangladesh
Deaths from cancer in Bangladesh
Ambassadors of Bangladesh to Italy
High Commissioners of Bangladesh to the United Kingdom
University of Dhaka alumni